Sarsen stones are silicified sandstone blocks found in quantity in Southern England on Salisbury Plain and the Marlborough Downs in Wiltshire; in Kent; and in smaller quantities in Berkshire, Essex, Oxfordshire, Dorset, and Hampshire.

Geology
Sarsen stones are the post-glacial remains of a cap of Cenozoic silcrete that once covered much of southern England – a dense, hard rock created from sand bound by a silica cement, making it a kind of silicified sandstone. This is thought to have formed during Neogene to Quaternary weathering by the silicification of Upper Paleocene Lambeth Group sediments, resulting from acid leaching.

Etymology
The word "sarsen" is a shortening of "Saracen stone" which arose in the Wiltshire dialect. In the Middle Ages, "Saracen" was a common name for Muslims, and came by extension to be used for anything regarded as non-Christian, whether Muslim or pagan in contrast to Christianity.

Human uses
The builders of Stonehenge used these stones for the Heel Stone and sarsen circle uprights. Avebury and many other megalithic monuments in southern England are also built with sarsen stones.

Fire and in later times explosives were sometimes employed to break the stone into pieces of a suitable size for use in construction. Sarsen is not an ideal building material, however. William Stukeley wrote that sarsen is "always moist and dewy in winter which proves damp and unwholesome, and rots the furniture".  In the case of Avebury, the investors who backed a scheme to recycle the stone were bankrupted when the houses they built proved to be unsaleable and also prone to burning down. However, despite these problems, sarsen remained highly prized for its durability, being a favoured material for steps and kerb stones.

See also
 Hertfordshire puddingstone
 Blowing Stone – Kingston Lisle
 Wayland's Smithy
 Fyfield Down
 Coronation Stone (Kingston upon Thames)
 Ashdown House, Oxfordshire

References

External links

 Photo of Sarsens on Fyfield Down, Wiltshire
 

Megalithic monuments in England
Stone (material)
Stonehenge